Abu Kheyl-e Arateh (also Romanized as Abū Kheyl-e Araţeh and Ābū Kheyl Araţeh; also known as Abūḩeyl-e Arateh) is a village in Bisheh Sar Rural District, in the Central District of Qaem Shahr County, Mazandaran Province, Iran. At the 2006 census, its population was 1,510, in 364 families.

References 

Populated places in Qaem Shahr County